In enzymology, a 4-coumarate—CoA ligase is an enzyme that catalyzes the chemical reaction

ATP + 4-coumarate + CoA  AMP + diphosphate + 4-coumaroyl-CoA

The 3 substrates of this enzyme are ATP, 4-coumarate, and CoA, whereas its 3 products are AMP, diphosphate, and 4-coumaroyl-CoA.

This enzyme belongs to the family of ligases, to be specific those forming carbon-sulfur bonds as acid-thiol ligases.  The systematic name of this enzyme class is 4-coumarate:CoA ligase (AMP-forming). Other names in common use include 4-coumaroyl-CoA synthetase, p-coumaroyl CoA ligase, p-coumaryl coenzyme A synthetase, p-coumaryl-CoA synthetase, p-coumaryl-CoA ligase, feruloyl CoA ligase, hydroxycinnamoyl CoA synthetase, 4-coumarate:coenzyme A ligase, caffeoyl coenzyme A synthetase, p-hydroxycinnamoyl coenzyme A synthetase, feruloyl coenzyme A synthetase, sinapoyl coenzyme A synthetase, 4-coumaryl-CoA synthetase, hydroxycinnamate:CoA ligase, p-coumaryl-CoA ligase, p-hydroxycinnamic acid:CoA ligase, and 4CL.  This enzyme participates in phenylpropanoid biosynthesis.

References 

 
 

EC 6.2.1
Enzymes of unknown structure
Hydroxycinnamic acids metabolism